Alexandra Jekova (born October 5, 1987) is a snowboarder from Bulgaria. She competed for Bulgaria at the 2010 Winter Olympics in snowboard cross and parallel giant slalom. Jekova was Bulgaria's flag bearer during the 2010 Winter Olympics opening ceremony. She finished 5th in the 2014 Olympics cross event and 6th at the 2018 Olympics.

At Winter X Games XVI, Jekova became the first Bulgarian to win a medal at the X Games, capturing silver in Snowboard X.

World Cup

Snowboard Cross Podiums

Parallel Giant Slalom Podium

References

External links
 
 
 
 

1987 births
Living people
Sportspeople from Sofia
Bulgarian female snowboarders
Olympic snowboarders of Bulgaria
Snowboarders at the 2006 Winter Olympics
Snowboarders at the 2010 Winter Olympics
Snowboarders at the 2014 Winter Olympics
Snowboarders at the 2018 Winter Olympics
X Games athletes
Universiade medalists in snowboarding
Universiade silver medalists for Bulgaria
Competitors at the 2015 Winter Universiade